Gravestone is a German heavy metal band, formed in 1977 as originally a progressive rock outfit, before going in to the heavy metal genre.

Gravestone released five studio albums between 1977 and 1986 before splitting up.  Several of the band members continued the band under the name 48 Crash. In 2019, the band reunited to play live shows again. The current line-up is the same as in 1985 (Majdan, Reinelt, Dieth, Sabisch, Imbacher).

Band members

Vocals
 Berti Majdan
 Dietmar "Oli" Orlitta

Drums
 Dieter Behle
 Thomas Imbacher
 Mike Schmidt

Bass Guitar
 Berti Majdan
 Dietmar "Oli" Orlitta
 Thomas Sabisch

Guitar
 Mathias Dieth
 Rudi Dorner
 Taki Gradl
 Jürgen Metko
 Klaus 'Doc' Reinelt 
 Wolfgang Rittner

Keyboards
 Andy Müller

Discography

Albums
 Doomsday (1979)
 War (1980)
 Victim of Chains (1984)
 Back to Attack (1985)
 Creating a Monster (1986)

Compilation albums
 The Best of Gravestone (1993)

References

External links
 MySpace Gravestone fanpage
 Tartarean Desire - Gravestone Band Page
 Encyclopaedia Metallum - Gravestone (Ger)

German heavy metal musical groups
German rock music groups
Musical groups established in 1977